Anolis jubar, the Cuban coast anole or Cubitas anole, is a species of lizard in the family Dactyloidae. The species is found in Cuba.

References

Anoles
Reptiles described in 1968
Endemic fauna of Cuba
Reptiles of Cuba
Taxa named by Albert Schwartz (zoologist)